Juan Castro Blanco National Park is a National Park, part of the Arenal Huetar Norte Conservation Area, in the northern part of Costa Rica.

Location 

Located about 100 km north of San José, to the east of Ciudad Quesada in Alajuela Province.

Geography 

It contains the active Platanar Volcano, the dormant Porvenir Volcano, and the inactive El Viejo Volcano. It was created in 1992 and covers an area of both rain and cloud forest.

The reserve contains the sources of the Aguas Zarcas, Platanar, Tora, Tres Amigos and La Vieja rivers.

Lake Pozo Verde is located within the park.

Flora and fauna 

The park contains a wide variety of orchids and birds as well as natural hot springs. At least 57 species of mammal recorded in the reserve and include jaguar, tapir, ocelots, sloths, howler monkeys,  red brocket deer and at least 22 species of bats. Over 233 species of birds, resident and migratory have been recorded including the national bird of Costa Rica the clay-coloured Thrush. Endangered species found on the park include the  Resplendent quetzal,  Great curassow, red brocket deer, and Black Guan.

Visitor facilities 

There is an extensive trail system that winds through the park and offers visitors the chance to see an array of plants and animals. Aside from the trail system, however, there are not any public facilities at the park.

References

External links 
 Juan Castro Blanco National Park at Costa Rica National Parks

National parks of Costa Rica
Protected areas established in 1992
Geography of Alajuela Province
Tourist attractions in Alajuela Province